The Omaha Zoo Railroad (OZRR) is the name of a  narrow-gauge heritage railroad located in the Henry Doorly Zoo & Aquarium in Omaha, Nebraska. The railroad offers a narrow gauge excursion train for zoo visitors hauled by a steam locomotive. The train loads passengers at two stations within the zoo. Annual ridership of the Omaha Zoo Railroad is over 200,000 people.

History
The Omaha Zoo Railroad was one of the first major attractions added after the zoo's 1963 re-incorporation as the Henry Doorly Zoo. As part of its centennial celebration, the Omaha-based Union Pacific Railroad decided to sponsor the construction of a ridable miniature railroad at the zoo. Two wyes (Y-shaped track arrangements enabling the train to reverse direction) were constructed at the intersections of the connecting track and the main oval. The track was laid using rail from the Union Pacific's Encampment branch in Wyoming. Due to the hilly terrain of the zoo's riverside location, grades of up to 6% (for most railroads 2% is considered steep) were required and some of the curves were well under  in radius. Track crews from the Union Pacific were brought in to lay the track, and operation commenced on July 22, 1968, under the supervision of UP Roadmaster Robert Kovar.

Fitting for a railroad attraction sponsored by the Union Pacific, the Omaha Zoo Railroad was initially themed after the UP's First transcontinental railroad route, for which Omaha was the eastern terminus. Passengers boarded at the "Omaha train depot" located in the Aksarben Nature Kingdom (today known as Red Barn Park) and rode to "Promontory Junction" at the south end of the zoo's lagoon, where they had the option of disembarking at the small depot and catching a later train back to Omaha. The ride also featured a climb up the 6% grade of "Sherman Hill", named for the Union Pacific's own grade over the continental divide in Wyoming. The steam locomotive was painted and decorated to resemble Union Pacific's No. 119, the famous locomotive used in the laying of the real "Golden spike" marking the transcontinental line's completion, and the four coaches were given names significant to the UP's history. The UP influence was perhaps most evident in the Omaha Zoo Railroad's logo: a Union Pacific shield with a smiling tiger superimposed over it. Though the direct references to Union Pacific place names have faded over the years, UP's support of the zoo railroad has remained strong. For years the train equipment was trucked to the Union Pacific's Omaha shops for winter maintenance, and when the shops closed much of the machinery was donated to build a new shop on site at the zoo. The Union Pacific Engine House, as this building is called, was dedicated in July 1994. Union Pacific crews continue to maintain the crossing signals along the zoo railroad's route.

During the 1970s the Omaha Zoo Railroad and the zoo as a whole saw large increases in attendance. Especially on the weekends, it became evident that the original four car train could not provide the needed capacity, and a search was begun for a second train. By chance, a small tank locomotive of Austrian Heritage named "Riva" was found in Romania and its owner, Plasser & Theurer, was willing to donate it to the zoo. The locomotive was restored in the UP's shops and entered service at the zoo in 1976, together with two extra cars that were purchased to augment the original four. Kenefick Station was added in 1981 allowing guests to board the train closer to the zoo's main entrance. In late 2014, the Kenefick station was demolished and the track was shortened to make room for plans of a new exhibit. (African Grasslands) A new Kenefick Station was opened in 2015, across the visitor pathway from the African Lodge.

In the early years the train commonly ran figure eights through the zoo using the connecting track and often reversed direction on the wyes. This practice ended in the early 1970s due to the need for faster turnarounds and the new locomotive's inability to negotiate a tight curve on the north (Bailey) wye. The connecting track lay idle for two decades before finally being removed in the mid-1990s, retaining a short section of track on the western side, and a wye at the eastern end, which were used for storing railcars not in use. These last remnants of the connecting trackage were removed in 2016, with new sidings for storing rolling stock installed just beyond the Omaha depot.

The Promontory Junction Station was abandoned in the early 1990s. Beginning in 2010, both trains have operated simultaneously on busy weekends allowing more frequent departures from the two stations.

Omaha Zoo Railroad Trains 

Visitors to the Henry Doorly Zoo ride behind one of three locomotives for the  trip around the park. Two of the engines are steam locomotives, and though they are similar in the basic principle of their operation, the two locomotives are otherwise quite different and guests can easily distinguish between them. The third engine is a diesel, which operates very differently from the steam locomotives. New coaches have been added and replacing the old coaches.

119 is the less powerful of the zoo's two locomotives and regularly hauls a train of five open-air coaches. This engine is known for its colorful paint scheme, polished brass, and sweet-sounding Nathan six chime whistle. No. 119 was the original locomotive on the Omaha Zoo Railroad and was custom built for the zoo in 1968. It was built by Crown Metal Products of Wyano, Pennsylvania, a company that built replica steam trains for amusement parks and zoos all over the country. In honor of zoo railroad benefactor Union Pacific, the engine was decorated to resemble the Union Pacific's ceremonial engine used at the 1869 completion of the first transcontinental railroad. It is a 4-4-0 "American" type locomotive, meaning that it has four pilot wheels to help guide it through curves, 4 large driving wheels, and no trailing wheels. This type of locomotive was prevalent on American railroads from 1850 to about 1880, thus earning it the nickname "American standard". During the 119's first years at the zoo, it was underpowered and had difficulty pulling the train up the steep hills. Subsequent modifications by the Union Pacific and the zoo railroad's own shop have improved it greatly, and after a major rebuild in 1996–1999, it was deemed to be in better-than-new condition. During the rebuild, the engine also received a cosmetic makeover. Originally painted black, gold and red, it emerged resplendent in a beautiful and more historically accurate scheme of crimson, maroon, and olive green. A new stained wood cab replicating the one on the original UP locomotive was also fitted. This engine returned to service in May 2013 after an overhaul.

Riva, number 104, is the zoo's second steam locomotive, acquired in 1974. It is a 0-6-2 tank locomotive, meaning that it carries its fuel oil and water in tanks on the locomotive rather than in a separate tender, as does the 119. It has six relatively small driving wheels and large cylinders, making it extremely powerful for its size and is also known for its European-style high-pitched whistle. A two-wheel trailing truck supports the firebox and cab. Generating tractive effort of 10,600 pounds it has almost twice the pulling power of 119, and typically operates with a train consisting of six open-air coaches and a caboose. The caboose has had its lettering, data, and logo removed.

Riva began its long career in 1890 when it was turned out by the Krauss Works of Linz, Austria as serial number 2360. Its first owner was the M.A.R. (Mori–Arco–Riva del Garda) Railway in northern Italian region of Trentino-South Tyrol, where it served as number 2 alongside two identical sister engines, "Arco" and "Lago di Garda". The railway was closed when Italy entered the World War I in 1915. The railway was on the front line and then sustained heavy damage, while "Riva" was sent to work on the Heeresfeldbahn (field military railways) in the Eastern front. From 1918 to 1941 it served an industrial railway in Stryj, Poland. World War II brought another stint in military duty before the engine finally ended up on the State Railways of Romania (CFR) as number 395–104. "Riva" operated on the CFR's Alba Julia–Zlatna line until 1968, when it was finally retired and sold to Plasser & Theurer, an Austria-based builder of track maintenance machinery. An American representative of Plasser & Theurer became aware of the Omaha Zoo's search for a second locomotive, and in 1974 arrangements were made for "Riva" to be donated to the zoo. Restoration took place in the Union Pacific's Omaha shops. The overhaul consisted of major running gear work, the installation of American air brake equipment, and conversion from coal to oil firing. The locomotive was then painted, and missing parts such as the headlights and bell were replaced. The reborn "Riva" entered service at the zoo in 1976 during the annual Family Night/Members' Day event, and has operated almost every year since. A major multi-year overhaul took place in the early 1990s and another in 2000–2002. During the winter and spring of 2005, the water tanks were replaced and the air tanks (added in 1976) were moved to a concealed location, returning the engine to a more historically correct appearance. The engine lost its cascade green and black paint scheme and was repainted all dark green with maroon wheels. The engine was given a new bell in 2013.

Virgie is the zoo's first diesel locomotive, acquired in 2008. It is a four-wheeled, 40-ton diesel switcher locomotive built by Plymouth, in 1957 and named for one of the railroad's founders. The engine, when arrived at the zoo, was painted light blue with red and black, and featured a likeness of a woman's face (presumably that of its previous owner's wife) on its front.  The zoo repainted the engine to red and black with white trim, and removed the face.  Virgie entered service in 2009, mainly used as a train set switcher and is used for multiple different shop tasks.

See also

Union Pacific No. 119, the basis for the zoo's original engine.
Transportation in Omaha
Disneyland Railroad
Walt Disney World Railroad

References

External links 
 Omaha's Henry Doorly Zoo official website.

Railway lines in Omaha, Nebraska
Heritage railroads in Nebraska
2 ft 6 in gauge railways in the United States
Tourist attractions in Omaha, Nebraska
Narrow gauge railroads in Nebraska
Transportation in Omaha, Nebraska
Railway lines opened in 1968
1968 establishments in Nebraska